The Kanhaiya Misl was founded by the Sandhu Jats.

Jai Singh Sandhu (son of Khushal Singh) of the village Kanha (district Lahore) was the founder of this Misl; hence the misl came to known as Kanhaiya Misl; another founder leader of this Misl was Amar Singh of Kingra village. Jai Singh and his brother Jhanda Singh had got initiation from the jatha of (Nawab) Kapur Singh; when all the Sikh Jathas were organised into 11 Misls, Jai Singh’s jatha was named as Kanhaiya Misl.

Haqiqat Singh Kanhaiya, Jeewan Singh, Tara Singh and Mehtab Singh (all four from village Julka, about 6 km from village Kanha) too were senior generals of this Misl.

In the battle of 1754, Jhanda Singh (brother of Jai Singh) died; after this Jai Singh married the widow of Jhanda Singh. Jai Singh was an adventurous general; he attacked areas around Pathankot and captured a lot of territory including Pathankot, Hajipur, Datarpur, Sujanpur and Mukerian; in 1770, he captured a large tract of Jammu State from its Hindu Dogra rulers.

Sobha Singh, one of the triumvirates who ruled over Lahore in the late 18th century prior to the leadership of Maharaja Ranjit Singh, was from the Kanhaiya Misl.

Gallery

References

Further reading

Misls
Social groups of Punjab, India
Jat princely states
Indian surnames
History of Sikhism
Sikh Empire
Princely states of India
Princely states of Punjab
History of Lahore
History of Punjab
History of Punjab, India